Andrey Yerguchyov (born 23 April 1995) is a Kazakhstani canoeist. Competing in the four-man K-4 1000 m  event he won a gold medal at the 2014 Asian Games and placed tenth at the 2016 Olympics. At the Rio Olympics he also finished 12th in the K-2 200 m event.

References

1995 births
Living people
Kazakhstani male canoeists
Olympic canoeists of Kazakhstan
Canoeists at the 2016 Summer Olympics
Place of birth missing (living people)
Asian Games gold medalists for Kazakhstan
Asian Games silver medalists for Kazakhstan
Asian Games medalists in canoeing
Canoeists at the 2014 Asian Games
Canoeists at the 2018 Asian Games
Medalists at the 2014 Asian Games
Medalists at the 2018 Asian Games